The Forest is a mostly instrumental album by David Byrne, released in 1991, inspired by the Epic of Gilgamesh and set during the later Industrial Revolution.  Some of the music from this orchestral album was originally used in a Robert Wilson directed theatre piece with the same name. The Forest premiered at the Theater der Freien Volksbühne, West Berlin in 1988.

Track listing
All tracks composed by David Byrne

Release history

"Forestry"
"Forestry" is a maxi-single by David Byrne containing dance and industrial remixes of pieces from The Forest by Jack Dangers, Rudy Tambala, and Anthony Capel.

Art Direction: Robin Lynch and David Byrne.
Design by Robin Lynch.
Front cover, "Feed Pump Pipework, Hinkley Point" by Douglass Allen.
Back cover, "Fodermaschinist" Deutsches Bergbau-Museum Bochum.
Inside, "The Forest" by David Byrne.

Track listing
"Ava" – Nu Wage Remix – Jack Dangers
"Nineveh" – Industrial Mix – Jack Dangers
"Ava" – Less Space Dance Mix Edit – Rudy Tambala / Anthony Capel
"Ava" – Space Dance Mix – Rudy Tambala / Anthony Capel
"Machu Picchu" – Album Version

References

1991 soundtrack albums
Albums produced by David Byrne
Luaka Bop soundtracks
Sire Records soundtracks
Warner Records soundtracks
David Byrne soundtracks
Classical music soundtracks
Theatre soundtracks